Rantoul station is an Amtrak intercity train station in Rantoul, Illinois, United States, on their  service. It was originally built by the Illinois Central Railroad. The City of New Orleans also uses these tracks, but does not stop.

References

External links 

Rantoul Amtrak Station (USA Rail Guide -- Train Web)

Amtrak stations in Illinois
Rantoul, Illinois
Transportation buildings and structures in Champaign County, Illinois
Former Illinois Central Railroad stations